Sultan Al-Qurairi (Arabic:سلطان الغريري) (born 12 January 1995) is a Qatari footballer who plays for Al-Markhiya as a goalkeeper.

Career
He formerly played for Umm Salal, Al-Shahania, Al-Bidda and Al-Markhiya.

External links

References

Living people
1995 births
Qatari footballers
Umm Salal SC players
Al-Shahania SC players
Al Bidda SC players
Al-Markhiya SC players
Qatar Stars League players
Qatari Second Division players
Association football goalkeepers
Place of birth missing (living people)